Capoeiras (Scrubs) is a city located in the state of Pernambuco, Brazil. Located  at 252.7 km away from Recife, capital of the state of Pernambuco. Has an estimated (IBGE 2020) population of 20,048 inhabitants.

Geography
 State - Pernambuco
 Region - Agreste Pernambucano
 Boundaries - São Bento do Una   (N);  Garanhuns    (S);  Jucati   (E);   Pesqueira and Caetés    (W).
 Area - 335.26 km2
 Elevation - 888 m
 Hydrography - Mundaú and Una rivers
 Vegetation - Caatinga Hiperxerófila
 Climate - Semi arid
 Annual average temperature - 20.4 c
 Distance to Recife - 252.7 km

Economy
The main economic activities in Capoeiras are based in commerce and agribusiness, especially tomatoes, beans, manioc, corn; and livestock such as cattle, pigs, sheep and poultry.

Economic indicators

Economy by Sector
2006

Health indicators

References

Municipalities in Pernambuco